Eugene Lee-Hamilton (6 January 1845 – 9 September 1907) was a late Victorian English poet. His work includes some notable sonnets in the style of Petrarch.  He endowed a literary prize administered by Oriel College in Oxford University, where he was a student.  The prize is open to students of Oxford and of Cambridge University and continues to this day.

Life and works
Eugene Lee-Hamilton was born in London on 6 January 1845; his parents were James Lee-Hamilton, who died in 1852, and Matilda Abadam (1815–1896), daughter of Edward Hamlyn Adams.

Lee-Hamilton was educated mainly in France and Germany. In 1864 he was sent to the University of Oxford. In 1869 he entered the British diplomatic service. He was first attached to the Embassy at Paris, where, due to his early experiences of French life, and mastery of the French language, he was eminently suitable. After the Franco-German War broke out he took part in the Alabama arbitration at Geneva. Subsequently he was appointed secretary in the British Legation at Lisbon. He had to renounce this second position in 1873, when, suddenly, he collapsed altogether, losing the use of his legs, and suffering agonies of pain. He expressed it in one of his sonnets,"To keep through life the posture of the grave,
While others walk and run and dance and leap."

It was to while away the tedium arising out of this malady that he first took to composing verse. All of his poetry from this time was composed without his touching pen or paper, and subsequently dictated.

Early poems
Hamilton's first miscellaneous poems appeared in 1878, and attracted no notice whatever; and it was only with the publication of The New Medusa that his poetry began to receive attention. This volume was followed, in 1885, by one entitled Apollo and Marsyas, and his next publication, entitled Imaginary Sonnets, came out in the fall of 1888. As a writer of sonnets he is most remarkable.

He spent much of his adult life suffering from psychological ailments.

He was nursed by his mother and sporadically by his half-sister, Violet Paget, who wrote under the name Vernon Lee. Lee-Hamilton lived with his mother and step-father in Florence, Italy, during his illness, and it was only after his mother died in 1896 and he recovered that he was able to travel again, eventually marrying the novelist Annie E. Holdsworth in 1898 and fathering a child, Persis Margaret, in 1903, but she died of meningitis in infancy. This led to him writing the poem, Mimma Bella; In Memory of a Little Life.

Analysis

Lee-Hamilton wrote in the tradition of shorter Victorian verse, particularly the dramatic sonnet. Robert Browning was an influence, but Lee-Hamilton refined the art of the dramatic monologue, and there is a restless imagination to his sonnets.

Certain motifs recur, such as submersion in water, being buried in the earth, being shackled, the conflict between body and mind, dark female archetypes such as the gorgon, and male archetypes such as the madman or the murderous lover. Lee-Hamilton has failures when an image or plot that loses force because it lacks restraint. His major works are his sonnets, and his successes depend on technical ability. He condensed the dramatic monologue into a sonnet format, and gained power, in sonnets that are concise and restrained.

Imaginary Sonnets (1888) drew on historical, mythic and imaginary figures: each spoken by a particular person at a definite time. Philip Hobsbaum (in Metre, Rhythm and Verse Form) suggests that Lee-Hamilton's Sonnets of the Wingless Hours (1894) is the only Victorian sonnet sequence that can compare to Gerard Manley Hopkins. In longer poems of collections such as the New Medusa (1882), there are narratives and dramatic monologues that explore the darker side of life; as in Browning, lust, jealousy, and fear predominate.

Works 
Poems and Transcripts (London: William Blackwood, 1878).
Gods, Saints and Men (London: W Satchell & Co, 1880).
The New Medusa (London: Eliot Stock, 1882).
Apollo and Marsyas (London: Eliot Stock, 1884).
Imaginary Sonnets (London: Elliot Stock, 1888).
The Fountain of Youth (London: Eliot Stock, 1891).
Sonnets of the Wingless Hours (London: Eliot Stock, 1894).
 (as translator), The Inferno of Dante (London: Grant Richards, 1898).
 (with his wife) Forrest Notes (London: Grant Richards, 1899).
The Lord of the Dark Red Star (London: The Walter Scott Publishing Co., 1903).
The Romance of the Fountain (London: T Fisher Unwin, 1905).
Mimma Bella (London: Heinemann, 1908).

Notes

References

Bibliography

Dramatic Sonnets, Poems and Ballads: Selections from and Poems of Eugene Lee-Hamilton (London: The Walter Scott Publishing Co., 1903).
(MacDonald P. Jackson, ed.), Selected Poems of Eugene Lee-Hamilton (1845–1907): A Victorian Craftsman Rediscovered (New York: The Edwin Mellen Press, 2002).

External links 

 
 
 

1845 births
1907 deaths
English translators
Translators of Dante Alighieri
Alumni of Oriel College, Oxford
Writers from London
English male poets
19th-century English poets
19th-century British translators
19th-century English male writers
English male non-fiction writers